Kadnikovsky is a rural locality (a village) and the administrative center of Kadnikovskoye Rural Settlement, Vozhegodsky District, Vologda Oblast, Russia. The population was 2,250 as of 2002. There are 24 streets.

Geography 
Kadnikovsky is located 20 km south of Vozhega (the district's administrative centre) by road. Kholuy is the nearest rural locality.

References 

Rural localities in Vozhegodsky District